Wu Tianjun (born February 1957) is a former Chinese politician, and the CPC Secretary of the Political and Legal Affairs Commission of Henan. He was dismissed from his position in November 2016 for investigation by the Central Commission for Discipline Inspection.

Career
Wu Tianjun was born in Puyang County, Henan in February 1957, and he was entered to  Anyang Agriculture University in 1977 and graduated in 1978. He joined the CPC in 1982. Then he became Deputy County Magistrate of Qi County in 1984. From 1987 to 1989, he served as Deputy Secretary of Neihuang County, and upgraded to Secretary in 1991. In 1994, he became the Deputy Mayor of Anyang, and transferred to Xinxiang in 2000. Wu served as Deputy Secretary, Mayor, Secretary until 2011.

In May 2011, Wu was appointed as the CPC Deputy Secretary and Mayor of Zhengzhou. He was appointed as Communist Party Secretary of the Political and Legal Affairs Commission of Henan in the first time in December 2011. In February 2012, he was appointed as the CPC Secretary of Zhengzhou. Wu was appointed as Communist Party Secretary of the Political and Legal Affairs Commission of Henan again in May 2016. He has not served as Member of CPC Provincial Standing Committee of Henan since October 2016.

Investigation
On November 11, 2016, Wu Tianjun was placed under investigation by the Central Commission for Discipline Inspection, the party's internal disciplinary body, for "serious violations of regulations". Wu was expelled from the Communist Party on January 23, 2017. On August 4, 2017, Wu was sentenced to 11 years in prison for taking bribes worth 11.05 million yuan in Xiangyang.

References

1957 births
Chinese Communist Party politicians from Henan
People's Republic of China politicians from Henan
Political office-holders in Henan
China University of Geosciences alumni
Living people
Politicians from Puyang
Chinese politicians convicted of corruption
Expelled members of the Chinese Communist Party